Cheng Rui (born 31 July 1979) is a former Chinese badminton player.

Career
Cheng graduated from the Hubei Sports School, entered the Hubei team in 1992, and selected to join the national team in 1998. In 2001, he joined the Qingdao Double Star Badminton Club. He was the men's doubles champion at the 2002 French International partnered with Wang Wei, also the runner-up at the Swiss and Japan Open partnered with Chen Qiqiu.

Achievements

Asian Championships 
Men's doubles

World Junior Championships 
Mixed doubles

Asian Junior Championships 
Mixed doubles

IBF World Grand Prix
The World Badminton Grand Prix sanctioned by International Badminton Federation (IBF) since 1983.

Men's doubles

BWF International Challenge/Series 
Men's doubles

References

External links
 
 
 程瑞 Chen Rui at badmintoncn.com

1979 births
Living people
Badminton players from Wuhan
Chinese male badminton players
World No. 1 badminton players